VTDK or VtdK may refer to:
Vilnius College of Technologies and Design (VTDK), a Lithuanian state institution of higher education
Vereniging tegen de Kwakzalverij (VtdK), a Dutch skeptical association campaigning against quackery